The National Art Gallery is a fine arts gallery of Shilpakala Academy in Segunbagicha, Dhaka, Bangladesh. It contains works of art from national artists, such as Zainul Abedin and Quamrul Hassan.

History
In 1974, the Bangladesh Shilpakala Academy, now called the National Academy of Fine and Performing Arts, was established in Bangladesh. The academy became the sole conservationists and protectors of art in 2003 and founded the National Art Gallery.

Gallery
The National Art Gallery's two storied building, constructed on the National Academy of Fine and Performing Art grounds, exhibits ways to prevent aging due to environmental factors and artwork from their permanent and temporary collection. There are also rooms for educational purposes, such as lectures about art preservation.

See also
 List of national galleries
 Madaripur Shilpakala Academy

References

External links
 National Art Gallery at Shilpakala Academy
 Art galleries of Bangladesh

Art museums and galleries in Bangladesh
Museums in Dhaka
Bangladesh
1974 establishments in Bangladesh